Cheng Nga Ching (born 24 January 2000 in Hong Kong) is a Hong Kong professional squash player. As of December 2021, she was ranked number 191 in the world.

References

2000 births
Living people
Hong Kong female squash players
21st-century Hong Kong women
Competitors at the 2022 World Games